Ivaí is a municipality in the state of Paraná in the Southern Region of Brazil.

Climate
The climate is highland subtropical climate but always humid (Köppen: Cfb), with an average temperature of 21.6 °C, some lower areas can transit to a humid subtropical climate (Cfa), transition found in the Ivaí Valley.

See also
List of municipalities in Paraná

Notes

References

Municipalities in Paraná